Without permission is a 2012 Iranian drama film directed by Morteza Harandi. And producers Mahmoud Fallah was it. The film is in competition at New Look in 2012, the twenty-ninth International Film Festival competition section for the police. movies without the permission of year was banned by the Ministry of Culture, and on 4 August 2012 in Tehran and throughout Iran's cinema was screened.

The film stars as Dariush Arjmand the mighty, Mohamad Kasebi, Nasrin Moghanloo, Mahdi Pakdel, Amyry Arjmand, Hamid Taleghani, Baran Zamani, Faraj Golsefidi, Zohreh Hamidi, Sanaz Kamalvand their role and Yasmina Baher was introduced as a theater actor, Varuzh Karim-Masihi has led to the formulation and manufacture of trailer.

Plot
20-year-old girl Yasi, very happy, friendly, open and interested to buy from wealthy father constraints facing many of the emotional issues very cautious in Peru to the room of a clothing store ....

Cast

 Mahdi Pakdel as amir
 Dariush Arjmand as father
 Nasrin Moghanloo as mother
 Mohamad Kasebi as Engineer
 Amiryal Arjmand as shahin
 Yasmina Baher as yasi

See also
 Film cinematography

References

External links
 
 facebook/bedoonejazeh
 cinetmag
 sourehcinema

2010s Persian-language films
2012 films
Iranian drama films
2012 drama films